The Jawadhu Hills block is a revenue block in the Tiruvannamalai district of Tamil Nadu, India. It has a total of 11 panchayat villages. Its altitude is 1,543 metres.

References 
 

Revenue blocks in Tiruvannamalai district